The Dominican Priory of Sudbury or Sudbury Priory, was a medieval priory of the Dominican Order, also known as the Order of Friar Preachers or "Black Friars", in the town of Sudbury, Suffolk, England. The community was dispersed and the buildings demolished during the English Reformation in the 16th century. The materials were used to construct a large house on the same site, which survived into the 19th century.

History
The Dominican Friars had arrived in England in about 1224, and came to Sudbury in 1272 when Baldwin de Shimperling and his wife Mabilla had a house built for them, supported by an endowment. In 1380, Simon himself donated a  square plot of land at a nearby spring, so that an underground conduit could be constructed to the priory for a fresh water supply; however, local opposition to the scheme caused a five year delay, and was only completed after the friars had applied for and received royal protection. The site included a priory church dedicated to Saint Saviour. A number of prominent local families had tombs in the church, including the Giffords, Cressenons, Walgraves and St. Quentins. The heart of the exiled lawyer, Sir Thomas Weyland, is said to have been interred at the priory church after his death in 1298. An notable figure in the priory community was John Hodgkins or Hodgkin, who was appointed provincial superior of the Dominicans in England in 1527 and was granted a house and garden inside the priory grounds; he later became the Protestant Bishop of Bedford.

During the tenure of John Cotton, the last prior, the priory was suppressed as part of the Dissolution of the Monasteries. The value of the estate was estimated at £222 and 18 shillings. In October 1539, the priory estate and buildings were granted to Thomas Eden, the Clerk of the King's Council and his wife, Griselda. They had the church and friars' house demolished and a large house built in its place. This stood about  back from Friar Street until about 1820, when it was demolished by its owner, James Marriott. He planned to reuse the materials in building a new church at his estate at Twinstead, which was never completed. During the demolition, a number of old tombs were uncovered; one stone sarcophagus was reused as a horse trough at the Maldon Grey pub in Sudbury, but had been broken up by the turn of the 20th century.

The only surviving elements of the original priory are the half timbered gatehouse in Friars Street, which dates from about 1500 and is a Grade II* listed building, and three 15th-century dwelling houses at 62a-64 Friars Street, which originally formed part of the priory complex and are Grade II listed.

References

Sources

Monasteries in Suffolk
Dominican monasteries in England
Christian monasteries established in the 13th century
1272 establishments in England
1539 disestablishments in England